The 2019 Nova Scotia Scotties Tournament of Hearts, the provincial women's curling championship of Nova Scotia, was held from January 21 to 27 at the Dartmouth Curling Club in Dartmouth. The winning Jill Brothers team represented Nova Scotia at the 2019 Scotties Tournament of Hearts in Sydney, Nova Scotia.

Qualification

Teams
The teams were listed as follows:

Round-robin standings

Round-robin results
All draw times are listed in Atlantic Standard Time (UTC-04:00)

Draw 1
Monday, January 21, 14:00

Draw 2
Tuesday, January 22, 09:00

Draw 3
Tuesday, January 22, 19:00

Draw 4
Wednesday, January 23, 14:00

Draw 5
Thursday, January 24, 09:00

Draw 6
Thursday, January 24, 19:00

Draw 7
Friday, January 25, 14:00

Tiebreakers
Saturday, January 26, 09:00

Playoffs

Semifinal
Saturday, January 26, 14:00

Final
Sunday, January 27, 09:00

References

External links

Nova Scotia
Curling competitions in Halifax, Nova Scotia
Sport in Dartmouth, Nova Scotia
2019 in Nova Scotia
January 2019 sports events in Canada